Olmarch Halt railway station, previously served the hamlet and rural locale of Olmarch near Llanddewi-Brefi and Pont Llanio on the Carmarthen Aberystwyth Line in the Welsh county of Ceredigion.

History
The Manchester and Milford Railway (M&MR) opened from Pencader to Aberystwyth on 12 August 1867. The line went into receivership from 1875 to 1900.

The Great Western Railway took over the service in 1906, and fully absorbed the line in 1911. The Great Western Railway and the station passed on to British Railways on nationalisation in 1948. It was then closed by the British Railways Board. The OS maps and photographs show that it had one platform that survives under the road overbridge.

Passenger services ran through to Aberystwyth until flooding severely damaged the line south of Aberystwyth in December 1964. A limited service continued running from Carmarthen to Tregaron for a few months after the line was severed, however this was the era of the Beeching Axe and the line was closed to passengers in February 1965.

The line remained open for milk traffic until 1970.

References 
Notes

Sources

External links
 Archive Images

Disused railway stations in Ceredigion
Railway stations in Great Britain opened in 1929
Railway stations in Great Britain closed in 1965
Former Great Western Railway stations
Beeching closures in Wales
1929 establishments in Wales
1965 disestablishments in Wales